John Anders Norrman (19 July 1884 – 11 November 1966), was a Swedish actor. Norrman appeared in over 70 roles in films between 1921 and 1964.

Selected filmography
 Norrtullsligan (1923)
 The Marriage Game (1935)
 Shipwrecked Max (1936)
 Mother Gets Married (1937)
 Storm Over the Skerries (1938)
 Life Begins Today (1939)
 With Open Arms (1940)
 Goransson's Boy (1941)
 The Talk of the Town (1941)
 Life in the Country (1943)
 She Thought It Was Him (1943)
 Blizzard (1944)
 Turn of the Century (1944)
 Brita in the Merchant's House (1946)
 The Bells of the Old Town (1946)
 Neglected by His Wife (1947)
 Private Karlsson on Leave (1947)
 The People of Simlang Valley (1947)
 Lars Hård (1948)
 On These Shoulders (1948)
 Perhaps a Gentleman (1950)
 Miss Julie (1951)
 A Ghost on Holiday (1951)
 For the Sake of My Intemperate Youth (1952)
 The Clang of the Pick (1952)
 Salka Valka (1954)
 Storm Over Tjurö (1954)
 Young Summer (1954)
 Enchanted Walk (1954)
 Men in the Dark (1955)
 The Light from Lund (1955)
 The People of Hemsö (1955)
 Tarps Elin (1956)
 The Girl in Tails (1956)
 The Minister of Uddarbo (1957)
 A Dreamer's Journey (1957)
 Bill Bergson Lives Dangerously (1957)
 The Great Amateur (1958)
 Playing on the Rainbow (1958)
 The Lady in Black (1958)
 A Goat in the Garden (1958)
 Mannequin in Red (1958)
 A Lion in Town (1959)
 Åsa-Nisse as a Policeman (1960)
 On a Bench in a Park (1960)
 Lovely Is the Summer Night (1961)
 Adventures of Nils Holgersson (1962)
 Sten Stensson Returns (1963)
 Swedish Portraits (1964)

References

External links

1884 births
1966 deaths
Swedish male film actors
Swedish male silent film actors
20th-century Swedish male actors